GNK Dinamo Zagreb (also known as Dinamo Zagreb, Dinamo and The Blues) are an association football club from Zagreb, Croatia. Home matches were played at the club's ground, Maksimir Stadium. Dinamo's season officially began 1 June 2010 and concluded on 30 May 2011, although competitive matches were played between 13 July and 25 May. During the season they competed in the Prva HNL, the highest division in Croatian football, and the Croatian Cup. They also played a total of twelve European games, first in the preliminary stages of the 2010–11 UEFA Champions League and later in the 2010–11 UEFA Europa League.

After guiding the club to their 12th Croatian league title in 2009–10, Krunoslav Jurčić resigned as manager of Dinamo in May 2010. He was replaced as manager by ex-Dinamo player and coach Velimir Zajec. However, after spending less than three months at the helm and after getting knocked out in the UEFA Champions League third qualifying round by Moldovan side Sheriff Tiraspol, Zajec was replaced in mid August by Bosnian manager Vahid Halilhodžić, whose previous post was managing the Ivory Coast national team.

Early in the season, first-team players including Ivan Turina, Ivica Vrdoljak and Croatia international striker Mario Mandžukić left the club while veteran defender Robert Kovač retired. New arrivals included striker Ante Rukavina, former Portugal international defender Tonel, Montenegro international forward Fatos Bećiraj and midfielder Arijan Ademi.

After a surprising league defeat to Rijeka on 31 July and the unsuccessful attempt to reach the UEFA Champions League group stage, the club's fortunes stabilised under Halilhodžić and Dinamo found themselves top of the league table by early October, a position they kept throughout the season. In spite of Dinamo's domestic dominance Halilhodžić gradually became target of increased criticism by sections of the media for what they saw as an inefficient style of football practised by the club, which culminated in a much publicized conflict with club president Zdravko Mamić in the half-time of the league game against minnows Inter Zaprešić in early May 2011. Halilhodžić's contract was then de facto terminated, so in the last four games of the season Dinamo was led by caretaker manager Marijo Tot. In other competitions Dinamo won the 2010–11 Croatian Cup, their 11th title, and appeared in the Europa League group stage for the fourth consecutive season, picking up seven points in eight matches and finishing third in their group behind Villarreal and PAOK.

Pre-season 
Legend

Super Cup 

As champions of the 2009–10 Prva HNL Dinamo qualified for the 2010 Croatian Super Cup, a one-off match played between league champions and Croatian Cup winners which serves as a curtain raiser for the following football season. This was the ninth Supercup played since the formation of the Croatian football league in 1992 and the first since 2006, as it is never held when a club wins "The Double" (Dinamo had won three consecutive Doubles in 2006–07, 2007–08 and 2008–09).

The match was decided in an Eternal Derby, as Dinamo played 2009–10 Croatian Cup winners and their greatest rivals Hajduk Split at Maksimir. It was their second competitive match led by the newly appointed manager Velimir Zajec and Dinamo won the game 1–0 through a second-half header by Igor Bišćan after Dodô delivered a corner kick. It was Dinamo's fourth Super Cup win and it later proved to be Zajec's only silverware won with Dinamo as he was sacked on 9 August.

Squad

Competitions

Overall

Prva HNL

Classification

Results summary

Results by round

Results by opponent 

Source: 2010–11 Prva HNL article

2010–11 UEFA Europa League

Group D

Matches

Key 

Tournament
 1. HNL = 2010–11 Prva HNL
 Supercup = Croatian Supercup
 Cup = 2010–11 Croatian Cup
 UCL = 2010–11 UEFA Champions League
 UEL = 2010–11 UEFA Europa League
Ground
 H = Home
 A = Away
 HR = Home replacement
 AR = Away replacement

Round
 R1 = Round 1 (round of 32)
 R2 = Round 2 (round of 16)
 QF = Quarter-finals
 SF = Semi-finals
 F = Final
 QR2 = Second Qualifying Round
 QR3 = Third Qualifying Round
 Play-off = Play-off Round
 Group = Group Stage

Competitive 

Last updated 25 May 2011Sources: Prva-HNL.hr, Sportske novosti, Sportnet.hr

Players

Statistics 
Competitive matches only. Updated to games played 25 May 2011.

Key

Source: Competitive matchesNotes:A: Mandžukić was transferred out to VfL Wolfsburg on 14 July 2010.B: Bećiraj joined Dinamo in August 2010 from FK Budućnost PodgoricaC: Sylvestr joined Dinamo in August 2010 from ŠK Slovan BratislavaD: Tonel joined Dinamo in August 2010 from Sporting CPE: Slepička went on a six-months loan to SpVgg Greuther Fürth in January 2011F: Etto left Dinamo to join PAOK in January 2011

Transfers

In 

Unless a country is specified, all clubs play in the Croatian football league system.

Out

References

External links 
 Dinamo Zagreb official website

2010-11
Croatian football clubs 2010–11 season
2010-11
2010–11 UEFA Europa League participants seasons